Boronia quinkanensis is a species of plant in the citrus family Rutaceae and is endemic to a small part of Queensland, Australia. It is an erect shrub with most parts covered with star-like hairs and has pinnate leaves with up to eleven leaflets, and pink to white, four-petalled flowers.

Description
The eight stamens alternate in length, size and shape. Flowering occurs from April to December.

Taxonomy and naming
Boronia quinkanensis was first formally described in 1999 by Marco F. Duretto and the description was published in the journal Austrobaileya. The specific epithet (quinkanensis) is a reference to Quinkan Country, where this species often occurs. The ending -ensis is a Latin suffix meaning "of" or "from".

Distribution and habitat
This boronia grows in woodland and heath in sandstone country south of Laura and disjunctly on Mount Mulligan further south.

Conservation status
Boronia quinkanensis is classed as "least concern" under the Queensland Government Nature Conservation Act 1992.

References 

quinkanensis
Flora of Queensland
Plants described in 1999
Taxa named by Marco Duretto